George Tyrrell  (6 February 1861 – 15 July 1909) was an Anglo-Irish Catholic priest and a leading modernist theologian and scholar.  A convert from Anglicanism, Tyrrell joined the Jesuit order in 1880. His attempts to adapt Catholic theology to modern culture and science made him a key figure in the modernist controversy that raged within the Roman Catholic Church in the late 19th century.  In the context of the anti-modernist campaign led by Pope Pius X, Tyrrell was expelled from the Jesuits in 1906 and finally excommunicated in 1908.

Early life
Tyrrell was born on 6 February 1861 in Dublin, Ireland. His father, a journalist, died shortly before Tyrrell was born. George was first cousin to Irish classical scholar Robert Yelverton Tyrrell. A childhood accident resulted in George eventually becoming deaf in the right ear. The family had to move repeatedly due to financial straits.

Tyrrell was brought up as an Anglican and around 1869 he attended Rathmines School, near Dublin. He was educated from 1873 at Midleton College, an institution affiliated with the Church of Ireland, but his mother had difficulty affording the fees and he left early. In 1876–77, he studied privately in the hopes of earning a scholarship to study Hebrew at Trinity College, Dublin, but he failed the required examination twice.  Around 1877 he met Robert Dolling, an Anglo-Catholic priest who had a strong influence on him. In August 1878, Tyrrell took a teaching post at Wexford High School, but in October he matriculated at Trinity College, on the advice of Dolling, hoping to train for the Anglican ministry.

Jesuit
In the spring of 1879, at Dolling's invitation, Tyrrell went to London to work for the Saint Martin's League, a sort of mission that Dolling was organizing. On Palm Sunday, Tyrrell wandered into St Etheldreda's, a Catholic church on Ely Place.  He was powerfully struck by the Catholic mass, about which he would say in his autobiography: "Here was the old business, being carried on by the old firm, in the old ways; here was continuity, that took one back to the catacombs."  He converted and was received into the Catholic Church in 1879. He immediately applied to join the Society of Jesus, but the provincial superior advised him to wait a year. He spent the interim teaching at Jesuit schools in Cyprus and Malta. He joined the Jesuits in 1880 and was sent to the novitiate at Manresa House.

As early as 1882, his novice master suggested that Tyrrell withdraw from the Jesuits due to a "mental indocility" and a dissatisfaction with a number of Jesuit customs, approaches, and practices. Tyrrell was, however, allowed to remain.  He later stated that he believed he was more inclined to the Benedictine spirituality.

After taking his first vows, Tyrrell was sent to Stonyhurst College to study philosophy as the first stage in his Jesuit formation.  Having completed his studies at Stonyhurst, he next returned to the Jesuit school in Malta, where he spent three years teaching. He then went to St Beuno's College, in Wales, to take up his theological studies.  He was ordained to the priesthood in 1891.

After a brief period of pastoral work in Lancashire, Tyrrell returned to Roehampton for his Tertianship. In 1893, he lived briefly at the Jesuit mission house in Oxford, before taking up pastoral work at St Helens, Merseyside, where he was reportedly happiest during his time as a Jesuit. A little over a year later, he was sent to teach philosophy at Stonyhurst.  Tyrrell then began to have serious conflicts with his superiors over the traditional Jesuit approach to teaching philosophy.

Pope Leo XIII's 1879 encyclical Aeterni Patris had promoted the teaching of a Scholastic philosophy, based on the works of Saint Thomas Aquinas, in Catholic schools and seminaries. Tyrrell admired Aquinas, but he rejected the Scholastic approach as inadequate.  He became convinced that the Jesuits were not teaching the work of Aquinas himself, but rather the narrow interpretation of it introduced by Jesuit theologian Francisco Suárez.

In 1896, Tyrrell was transferred to the Jesuit House on Farm Street in London.  There Tyrrell discovered the work of Maurice Blondel. He was also influenced by Alfred Loisy's biblical scholarship. Tyrrell first met Friedrich von Hügel in October 1897 and they became close friends. Part of Tyrrell's work while at Farm Street was writing articles for the Jesuit periodical The Month. He had the occasion to review some works by Wilfrid Ward, and for a time, came to share Ward's view of moderate liberalism.

Modernist controversy 

Between 1891 and 1906, Tyrrell published more than twenty articles in Catholic periodicals, many of them in the United States.  In 1899 Tyrrell published A Perverted Devotion. The article concerned the concept of hell. Given "the essential incapacity of finite mind to seize the absolute end which governs and moves everything towards itself", Tyrrell recognized that some subjects were matters of "faith and mystery". He "preferred to admit that the Christian doctrine of hell as simply a very great mystery, one difficult to reconcile with any just appreciation of the concept of an all-loving God". He argued that the rationalist approach of the Scholastics was not applicable to matters of faith. Although reviewed by a number of English Jesuits, including Herbert Thurston, who found no fault with it, the Father General determined that it was "offensive to pious ears". Tyrrell was assigned to a small mission in Richmond, where he deeply appreciated the peace and quiet. In January 1901, he declined a re-assignment back to St. Helen's.

Tyrrell was critical both of the Catholic neo-Scholasticism and of the Liberal Protestant scholarship of the day.  In an often quoted attack on Adolf von Harnack's approach to Biblical criticism, Tyrrell wrote that "the Christ that Harnack sees, looking back through nineteen centuries of 'Catholic darkness', is only the reflection of a Liberal Protestant face, seen at the bottom of a deep well."  On the other hand, Tyrrell advocated "the right of each age to adjust the historico-philosophical expression of Christianity to contemporary certainties, and thus to put an end to this utterly needless conflict between faith and science which is a mere theological bogey."  In Tyrrell's view, the pope should not act as an autocrat but a "spokesman for the mind of the Holy Spirit in the Church".

Expulsion and excommunication 

Asked in 1906 to repudiate his theories, Tyrrell declined and was dismissed from the Jesuits by Father General Franz X. Wernz. He was the only Jesuit to be expelled from the society in the twentieth century until a subsequent Father General, Pedro Arrupe, expelled the Dutch priest Huub Oosterhuis in 1969. Modernism played a major role in both cases.

With the condemnation of modernism, first in the 65 propositions of the decree Lamentabili sane exitu in July 1907 and then in the encyclical Pascendi dominici gregis in September 1907, Tyrrell's fate was sealed.  Tyrrell contributed two letters to The Times in which he strongly criticized that encyclical.  For his public rejection of Pascendi, Tyrrell was also deprived of the sacraments, in what Peter Amigo, the Bishop of Southwark, characterized as "a minor excommunication".

In his rebuttal of Pius X's encyclical, Tyrrell alleged that the Church's thinking was based on a theory of science and on a psychology that seemed as strange as astrology to the modern mind. Tyrrell accused Pascendi of equating Catholic doctrine with Scholastic theology and of having a completely naïve view of doctrinal development. He furthermore asserted that the encyclical tried to show the "modernist" that he was not a Catholic, but succeeded only in showing that he was not a Scholastic.

Unlike Alfred Loisy, Tyrrell never saw his case come up before the Congregation of Index or the Holy Office. His fate rested in the hands of the Cardinal Secretary of State, Rafael Merry del Val, who collaborated closely with Bishop Amigo.

Death
Tyrrell's last two years were spent mainly in Storrington. He was given extreme unction on his deathbed in 1909, but as he refused to abjure his modernist views was denied burial in a Catholic cemetery. A priest, his friend Henri Brémond, was present at the burial and made a sign of the cross over Tyrrell's grave, which resulted in Bishop Amigo temporarily suspending Fr. Bremond a divinis.

A near contemporary account places most of the blame for the disagreement between the modern Catholic philosophers and the Vatican on Cardinal Merry del Val's "irreconciliable and reactionary attitude".

Selected writings
 Nova et Vetera: Informal Meditations, 1897
 Hard Sayings: A Selection of Meditations and Studies, Longmans, Green & Co., 1898
 External Religion: Its Use and Abuse, B. Herder, 1899
 The Faith of the Millions 1901
 Lex Orandi: or, Prayer & Creed, Longmans, Green & Co., 1903
 Lex Credendi: A Sequel to Lex Orandi, Longmans, Green & Co., 1906
 Through Scylla and Charybdis: or, The Old Theology and the New, Longmans, Green & Co., 1907
 A Much-Abused Letter, Longmans, Green, and Co., 1907
 Medievalism: A Reply to Cardinal Mercier, Longmans, Green, and Co. 1908
 The Church and the Future, The Priory Press, 1910
 Christianity at the Cross-Roads, Longmans, Green and Co., 1910
 Autobiography and Life of George Tyrrell, Edward Arnold, 1912
 Essays on Faith and Immortality, Edward Arnold, 1914

Articles
 "The Clergy and the Social Problem," The American Catholic Quarterly Review, Vol. XXII, 1897.
 "The Old Faith and the New Woman", The American Catholic Quarterly Review, Vol. XXII, 1897.
 "The Church and Scholasticism", The American Catholic Quarterly Review, Vol. XXIII, 1898.

References

Further reading
 Chappell, Jonathan W. (2018). "Beyond 'The Warfare of Science with Theology': George Tyrrell's Plea for Epistemic Humility," Science and Christian Belief, Vol 30, No 1., pp. 3–37.

 Davies, Michael (1983). "The Sad Story of George Tyrrell", Ch. 13 of Partisans of Error: St. Pius X Against the Modernists. Long Prairie, Minnesota: The Neumann Press.
 Inge, William Ralph (1919). "Roman Catholic Modernism." In: Outspoken Essays. London: Longmans, Green & Co., pp. 137–171.
 Leonard, Ellen (1982) George Tyrrell and the Catholic Tradition New York: Paulist Press. 
 Maher, Anthony M. (2018). 'The Forgotten Jesuit of Catholic Modernism: George Tyrrell's Prophetic Theology.' Minneapolis: Augsburg Fortress Press.
 May, J. Lewis (1932). Father Tyrrell and the Modernist Movement. London: Eyre and Spottiswoode.
 Moore, J.F. (1920). "The Meaning of Modernism," The University Magazine, Vol. XIX, No. 2, pp. 172–178.
 Petre, Maude (1912). Autobiography and Life of George Tyrrell. London: E. Arnold.
 Rafferty, Oliver P. (ed.) (2010). George Tyrrell and Catholic Modernism. Dublin: Four  Courts  Press, .
 Ratté, John (1967). Three Modernists: Alfred Loisy, George Tyrrell, William L. Sullivan. New York: Sheed & Ward.

 Root, John D. (1977). "English Catholic Modernism and Science: The Case of George Tyrrell," The Heythrop Journal, Vol. XVIII, No. 3, pp. 271–288.
 Sagovsky, Nicholas (1990). On God's Side: A Life of George Tyrrell. Oxford: Clarendon Press.

 Savage, Allan (2012). The "Avant-Garde" Theology of George Tyrrell: Its Philosophical Roots Changed My Theological Thinking. (CreateSpace.com) 
 Schultenover, David G. (1981). George Tyrrell: In Search of Catholicism. Shepherdstown, West Virginia: Patmos Press.
 Wells, David F. (1972). "The Pope as Antichrist: The Substance of George Tyrrell's Polemic," Harvard Theological Review, Vol. LXV, No. 2, pp. 271–283.
 Wells, David F. (1979). The Prophetic Theology of George Tyrrell. Chico, CA: Scholars Press.
 Utz, Richard (2010). "Pi(o)us Medievalism vs. Catholic Modernism: The Case Of George Tyrell." In: The Year's Work in Medievalism, Vol. XXV. Eugene, Or.: Wipf & Stock Publishers, pp. 6–11.

External links

 
 

1861 births
1909 deaths
Catholicism-related controversies
Converts to Roman Catholicism from Anglicanism
Former Jesuits
Irish Anglicans
19th-century Irish Roman Catholic theologians
Christian clergy from Dublin (city)
19th-century Irish Jesuits
People educated at Midleton College
People excommunicated by the Catholic Church
Modernism in the Catholic Church
People from Storrington
20th-century Irish Roman Catholic theologians